Leela Mishra (1 January 1908 – 17 January 1988) was an Indian actress. She worked as a character actor in over 200 Hindi films for five decades, and is best remembered for playing stock characters such as aunts (Chachi or Mausi). She is best known for her role of "mausi" in the blockbuster Sholay (1975), Dil Se Mile Dil (1978), Baton Baton Mein (1979), Rajesh Khanna films such as Palkon Ki Chhaon Mein, Aanchal, Mehbooba, Amar Prem and Rajshri Productions hits such as Geet Gaata Chal (1975), Nadiya Ke Paar (1982) and Abodh (1984). Her career's best performance was in Naani Maa in 1981, for which she received Best Actress award at the age of 73.

Personal life
Leela Mishra was married to Ram Prasad Mishra, who was a character artist, then working in silent films. She got married at the very young age of 12. By the time she was 17, she had two daughters. She hailed from Jais, Raebareli, and she and her husband were from zamindar (landowners) families.

Career
Leela Mishra was discovered by a man called Mama Shinde, who was working for Dadasaheb Phalke's Nasik Cinetone. He persuaded her husband to make her work in films. During those days there was a severe scarcity of women actors in films; this was evident in the paychecks that the Mishras received when they went to Nasik for the shooting. While Ram Prasad Mishra was hired on a salary of Rs. 150 per month, Leela Mishra was offered Rs. 500 per month. However, as they fared poorly in front of the camera, their contracts were cancelled.

The next opportunity that came their way was an offer to work in the movie Bhikarin, which was being produced by a company owned by the Maharaja of Kolhapur. However, Leela Mishra lost out on this opportunity too, as the role required her to put her arms round the actor (who was not her husband) while delivering a dialogue, which she point-blank refused to do.

She faced a similar problem while working in another film titled Honhaar. She was cast opposite Shahu Modak as a heroine, and was supposed to hug and embrace him, which she again refused steadfastly. Since the company was legally in a weak position, they couldn't turn her out of the film, which proved to be a blessing in disguise for her. She was offered Modak's mother's role in the film and it clicked instantly. This opened the doors for her to play mother roles at the young age of 18.

Notable works
Early on in her career she acted in films such as the musical hit Anmol Ghadi (1946), Raj Kapoor's Awaara (1951) and Nargis-Balraj Sahni starrer Lajwanti (1958), which was nominated for the Palme d'Or for Best Film at 1959 Cannes Film Festival.

She acted in the first Bhojpuri film, Ganga Maiyya Tohe Piyari Chadhaibo (1962), which also starred Kumkum, Helen and Nazir Hussain.

Her roles varied from mothers, benign or evil aunts, to comic roles.

Death
She died of a heart attack in Bombay on 17 January 1988 at the age of 80.

Partial filmography

Chitralekha (1941): Nandrekar, Mehtaab Bano, A.S.Gyani, Monica Desai, Leela Mishra, Ram Dulai, Ganpatrai Premi, Bharat Bhushan
Anmol Ghadi (1946): Surendra, Noorjehan, Suraiya, Zahoor Raja, Leela Mishra, Murad
Elan (1947): Surendra, Munawar Sultana, Mohd. Afzal, Zebunissa, Leela Mishra, Shah Nawaz, Reehan, W.M. Khan, Shaheeda, Rita
Rambaan (1948): Shobhana Samarth, Prem Adib, Chandra Mohan
Daulat (1949):Mahipal,Madhubala,Jankidas
Sheesh Mahal (1950): Sohrab Modi, Naseem Banu, Mubarak, Pran, Nigar Sultana, Leela Mishra
Aaram (1951): Dev Anand, Madhubala, Premnath, Durgabai, Leela Mishra
Awaara (1951): Prithviraj Kapoor, Leela Chitnis, Raj Kapoor, Nargis, Premnath, Nimmi, Leela Mishra
Daag (1952 film) - as Jagat's wife (Dilip kumar's neighbour) Dilip Kumar, Nimmi, Usha Kiran, Kanhaiyalal, Leela Mishra
Aandhiyan (1952): Dev Anand, Nimmi, Shyama, Leela Mishra
Shikast (1953): Dilip Kumar, Nalini Jaywant, Leela Mishra
Ladki (1953) as Mrs. Hazurdas
Pyaasa (1957): Guru Dutt, Mala Sinha, Johnny Walker, Leela Mishra
Sahara (1958)
Lajwanti (1958)
Santan (1959) : Rajendra Kumar, Kamini Kadam
College Girl (1960): Shammi Kapoor
Suhaag Sindoor (1961): Manoj Kumar, Mala Sinha, Leela Mishra
Ummeed (1962)
Ganga Maiyya Tohe Piyari Chadhaibo (1962) Bhojpuri film
Ghar Basake Dekho (1963) as Kashi, Ganga's mother
Leader (1964)
Dosti (1964)
Chhoti Chhoti Baten (1965)
Raat Aur Din (1967)
Ram Aur Shyam(1967) as Shyam's mother
Majhli Didi (1967)
Bahu Begum (1967) as Kareeman Bua
Dharti Kahe Pukarke (1969)
Tumse Achha Kaun Hai (1969)
Suhana Safar (1970) 
Dushman (1971)
Lal Patthar (1971)
Amar Prem (1971)
Albela (1971)
Mere Apne (1971)
Parichay (1972)
Samadhi(1972)
Annadata (1972)
Saudagar (1973) as Badi Bi
Honeymoon (1973)
Bada Kabutar (1973)
Maa Ka Aanchal (1975)
Jai Santoshi Maa (1975): Kanan Kaushal, Leela Mishra
Sholay (1975): Sanjeev kumar, Amitabh, Jaya, Dharam, Hema, Leela Mishra, Amjad Khan, A.K. Hangal, Sachin
Geet Gaata Chal (1975): Sachin Pilgaonkar, Sarika, Urmila Bhatt, Leela Mishra
Khushboo (1975): Jeetendra , Hema Malini
Bairaag (1976) Dilip Kumar, Leena Chandavarkar
Mehbooba (1976)
Phool aur Insaan  (1976)
Paheli (1977)
Palkon Ki Chhaon Mein (1977)
Kinara (1977)
Dulhan Wahi Jo Piya Man Bhaaye (1977)
Shatranj ke Khilari (1977): Sanjeev Kumar
Nasbandi (1978)
Sunayana (1979)
Sawan Ko Aane Do (1979)
Sargam
Baton Baton Mein (1979) Amol Palekar, Tina Munim
Nani Maa 1981 - Best Actress and Best Comedy Diploma Award – Moscow Film festival – India – 1981
Daasi (1981)
Chashme Buddoor  (1981), Farooq Sheikh, Deepti Naval
Aamne Samne (1982)
Katha (1983) Naseeruddin Shah, Farooq Sheikh, Deepti Naval
Sadma (1983) Kamal Hasan, Sridevi
Abodh (1984) Madhuri Dixit, Tapas Paul
Prem Rog (1985) Rishi Kapoor, Padmini Kolhapure
Tan-Badan (1986) Govinda , Khushbu
Veerana (1988) Hemant Birje, Sahila Chaddha
Zakhmi Aurat (1988) Raj Babbar, Dimple KapadiaDaata (1989) Mithun Chakraborty, Padmini Kolhapure

References

External links

Leela Mishra at Bollywood Hungama''
Leela Mishra Filmography at Upperstall

Indian film actresses
1988 deaths
People from British India
Actresses in Hindi cinema
Actresses in Bhojpuri cinema
People from Amethi district
1908 births
20th-century Indian actresses